The 2007 Kansas Lottery Indy 300 was a race in the 2007 IRL IndyCar Series, held at Kansas Speedway. It was held over the weekend of 27–29 April 2007, as the fourth round of the seventeen-race calendar in the 2007 IndyCar championship.

Results

References
USA Today
IndyCar Series

Kansas Lottery Indy 300
Kansas Indy 300
Kansas Lottery Indy 300
Kansas Lottery Indy 300